Lambert's Cove is a region in Tisbury and West Tisbury, Massachusetts, on the island of Martha's Vineyard. It extends from Upper Lambert's Cove in west Tisbury to Lower Lambert's Cove in Tisbury. Lambert's Cove Road accesses several roads of note, including Makonikey and Longview. It is known for its views of the hilly region of "up island." The road is the only access to West Tisbury's north shore coastline, and accesses the only public beach of the town. Some sites of note found along Lambert's Cove include Lambert's Cove Beach, Makonikey beach, Cottle's lumberyard, the old cranberry bog, Duarte's Pond and Seth's Pond. It also accesses the FOCUS Study Center, a faith-based summer camp near Seth's Pond. Lambert's Cove is also mentioned in popular folk artist James Taylor's song "Terra Nova" ("Out to the west of Lambert's Cove, there is a sail out in the sun..."), sung by then wife Carly Simon.

Road 
Lambert's Cove Road is separated into two sections. Lower Lambert's Cove begins in the Town of Tisbury and contains the old cranberry bog. Upper Lambert's Cove begins in the center of West Tisbury and accesses Lambert's Cove Beach, Seth's Pond and the FOCUS Study Center. It is the sole access to a large number of summer and year-round residences.

Region 
Situated on the hilly, western coast of the Island of Martha's Vineyard, the Lambert's Cove region can most closely be distinguished by its hilly terrain. The area contains the northernmost extension of the hilly range that extends from the tip of Aquinnah to Upper Lambert's Cove. The appearance of such hills on the island falls in stark contrast to the relatively flat land of the rest of Martha's Vineyard. This flatland is often attributed to the glacial activity that separated Martha's Vineyard from the mainland 10,000 years ago during the last Ice Age. The western parts of Martha's Vineyard, including Lambert's Cove, avoided the glacial scraping and thus retained their hilly terrain. The Lambert's Cove region is also home to many of the oak and beech trees on the island of Martha's Vineyard. As opposed to the scrub oaks and pines located on the rest of Martha's Vineyard, Lambert's Cove is home to many of the thicker and greener forests on the island.

Geography of Dukes County, Massachusetts
Tourist attractions in Tisbury, Massachusetts
Tourist attractions in West Tisbury, Massachusetts